Lange v Atkinson [1997] 2 NZLR 22 (HC), [1998] 3 NZLR 424 (CA), [2000] 1 NZLR 257 (PC), [2000] 3 NZLR 385 is a cited case in New Zealand regarding defamation claims in tort.

Background
Joe Atkinson, a political columnist, wrote an article critical of Former Prime Minister David Lange and the 4th Labour Government which was published in the October 1995 issue of North & South magazine.

Lange found the article defamatory, and sued Atkinson, and the magazines publisher ACP for defamation, upon which they filed a defence of qualified privilege.

Lange spent the next 4 years trying to get their defence struck out.

The Court of Appeal's final hearing in Lange v Atkinson (No. 2) remains the leading case on the law of qualified privilege in New Zealand and affirmed that qualified privilege extends to publications concerning the conduct of publicly elected officeholders and those seeking such office.

See also
Besides featuring in NZ case law for defamation, David Lange also featured in Australian defamation case law in Lange v Australian Broadcasting Corporation (1997) 189 CLR 520; 145 ALR 96 (HCA).

References

Judicial Committee of the Privy Council cases on appeal from New Zealand
New Zealand tort case law
2000 in New Zealand law
2000 in case law